Lakewood Township is the most populous township in Ocean County, in the U.S. state of New Jersey. A rapidly growing community, as of the 2020 United States census, the township's population was 135,158, its highest decennial count ever and an increase of 42,315 (+45.6%) from the 2010 census count of 92,843, which in turn reflected an increase of 32,491 (+53.8%) from the 60,352 counted at the 2000 census. The township ranked as the fifth-most-populous municipality in the state in 2020, after ranking seventh in 2010 and 22nd in 2000. The sharp increase in population from 2000 to 2010 was led largely by increases in the township's Orthodox Jewish and Latino communities. Further growth in the Orthodox community led to a sharp increase in population in the 2020 census, with a large number of births leading to a significant drop in the township's median age. The Census Bureau's Population Estimates Program calculated that the township's population was 138,070 in 2021, surpassing Elizabeth as the fourth-most-populous municipality in New Jersey.

As a major hub of Orthodox Judaism, Lakewood is home to Beth Medrash Govoha (BMG), the largest yeshiva outside of Israel. The large Orthodox population, which comprises more than half the township's population, strongly influences the township's culture and wields considerable political clout in the township as a voting bloc.

History
The earliest documented European settlement of the present Lakewood area was by operators of sawmills, from about 1750 forward. One such sawmill—located at the east end of the present Lake Carasaljo—was known as Three Partners Mill from at least 1789 until at least 1814. From 1815 until 1818, in the same area, Jesse Richards had an iron-smelting operation known as Washington Furnace, using the local bog iron ore. The ironworks were revived in 1833 by Joseph W. Brick, who named the business Bergen Iron Works, which also became the name of the accompanying town. In 1865, the town was renamed Bricksburg in 1865, and in 1880, it was renamed Lakewood and became a fashionable winter resort.

Lakewood's developers thought that "Bricksburg" didn't capture their vision for the community, and the names "Brightwood" and "Lakewood" were proposed. After reaching out to area residents, "Lakewood" was chosen, and the United States Postal Service approved the name in March 1880. The name "Lakewood" was intended to focus on the location near lakes and pine forests.

Lakewood was incorporated as a township by an act of the New Jersey Legislature on March 23, 1892, from portions of Brick Township. Portions of Howell Township in Monmouth County were annexed to Lakewood Township in 1929.

Lakewood's three most prominent hotels were the Laurel House (opened in 1880; closed in 1932), the Lakewood Hotel (opened January 1891, closed in 1925), and the Laurel-in-the-Pines (opened December 1891, burned down in 1967). Lakewood's promoters claimed that its winter temperature was usually about ten degrees warmer than that of New York City and were warmer than points located further south, but this claim is not substantiated by official records of the United States Weather Bureau. During the 1890s, Lakewood was a resort for the rich and famous, and The New York Times devoted a weekly column to the activities of Lakewood society. Grover Cleveland spent the winters of 1891–1892 and 1892–1893 in a cottage near the Lakewood Hotel, commuting to his business in New York City. Mark Twain also enjoyed vacationing in Lakewood. George Jay Gould I acquired an estate at Lakewood in 1896, which is now Georgian Court University. John D. Rockefeller bought a property in 1902 which later became Ocean County Park. Lakewood's hotel business remained strong in the 1920s and 1950s, but went into severe decline in the 1960s.

In 1943, Aharon Kotler founded Beth Medrash Govoha (BMG). In time, it would grow to become the largest yeshiva outside of Israel. In the 1960s, much of the woods and cranberry bogs in the township were replaced by large housing developments. Leisure Village, a condominium retirement development on the south side of Route 70, opened for sale in 1963.

Geography

According to the United States Census Bureau, the township had a total area of 25.08 square miles (64.95 km2), including 24.68 square miles (63.92 km2) of land and 0.40 square miles (1.03 km2) of water (1.59%).

The North Branch of the Metedeconk River forms the northern boundary and part of the eastern boundary of the township, while the South Branch runs through the township. A southern portion of the township is drained by the north branch of Kettle Creek. As implied in its name, Lakewood township has four lakes, all of them man-made; three of them—Lake Carasaljo, Manetta, and Shenandoah—are on the South Branch of the Metedeconk River, whereas the fourth—Lake Waddill—is on Kettle Creek.

Lakewood CDP (2010 Census population of 53,805), Leisure Village (4,400 as of 2010) and Leisure Village East (4,217 as of 2010) are unincorporated communities and census-designated places (CDPs) located within Lakewood Township.

Other unincorporated communities, localities and place names located partially or completely within the township include Greenville, Lake Carasaljo, Seven Stars and South Lakewood.

The township borders the municipalities of Brick Township, Jackson Township, and Toms River in Ocean County; and Howell Township in Monmouth County.

The township, including a portion of its southwestern portion, is one of 11 municipalities in Ocean County that are part of the Toms River watershed.

Demographics

A study of Jewish communities published under the auspices of the Berman Jewish DataBank estimated that Lakewood had a total Jewish population of 54,500 in 2009, about 59% of the township's 2010 population. A 2018 estimate by NJ.com found that two-thirds of the township's residents, or about 90,000 people, were Orthodox Jews.

The median value of owner occupied housing is $322,000 with an average mortgage of $2,216 and additional housing expenses of $807. The median gross rent is $1,463.

2010 census

The Census Bureau's 2006-2010 American Community Survey showed that (in 2010 inflation-adjusted dollars) median household income was $41,527 (with a margin of error of +/− $1,797) and the median family income was $45,420 (+/− $2,296). Males had a median income of $39,857 (+/− $4,206) versus $32,699 (+/− $2,365) for females. The per capita income for the township was $16,430 (+/− $565). About 21.9% of families and 26.1% of the population were below the poverty line, including 36.0% of those under age 18 and 5.7% of those age 65 or over.

2000 census
As of the 2000 United States census there were 60,352 people, 19,876 households, and 13,356 families residing in the township. The racial makeup of the township was 78.77% White, 12.05% African American, 0.17% Native American, 1.39% Asian, 0.03% Pacific Islander, 4.61% from other races, and 2.98% from two or more races. Hispanic or Latino of any race were 14.80% of the population.

There were 19,876 households, out of which 32.2% had children under the age of 18 living with them, 53.3% were married couples living together, 10.6% had a female householder with no husband present, and 32.8% were non-families. 28.5% of all households were made up of individuals, and 19.5% had someone living alone who was 65 years of age or older. The average household size was 2.92 and the average family size was 3.64.

In the township the population was spread out, with 31.8% under the age of 18, 10.1% from 18 to 24, 23.5% from 25 to 44, 15.7% from 45 to 64, and 18.9% who were 65 years of age or older. The median age was 31 years. For every 100 females, there were 91.6 males. For every 100 females age 18 and over, there were 85.5 males.

The median income for a household in the township was $35,634, and the median income for a family was $43,806. Males had a median income of $38,967 versus $26,645 for females. The per capita income for the township was $16,700. About 15.7% of families and 19.8% of the population were below the poverty line, including 28.9% of those under age 18 and 7.7% of those age 65 or over.

Economy
Portions of the township are part of an Urban Enterprise Zone (UEZ), one of 32 zones covering 37 municipalities statewide. Lakewood was selected in 1994 as one of a group of 10 zones added to participate in the program. In addition to other benefits to encourage employment within the UEZ, shoppers can take advantage of a reduced 3.3125% sales tax rate (half of the % rate charged statewide) at eligible merchants. Established in November 1994, the township's Urban Enterprise Zone status expires in October 2025. The UEZ is overseen by the Lakewood Development Corporation, which works to foster the UEZ and the businesses that operate inside it through loan and grant programs.

Education
Lakewood School District serves students in pre-kindergarten through twelfth grade, and is broken up into three different stages of schooling. As of the 2018–19 school year, the district, comprised of eight schools, had an enrollment of 6,767 students and 492.5 classroom teachers (on an FTE basis), for a student–teacher ratio of 13.7:1. Schools in the district (with 2018–19 enrollment data from the National Center for Education Statistics) are 
Lakewood Early Childhood Center with 206 students in Pre-K, 
Ella G. Clarke School with 606 students in grades 2–5, 
Clifton Avenue School with 365 students in grades 2–5, 
Oak Street School with 794 students in grades 1–5, 
Piner Elementary School with 509 students in grades Pre-K–1, 
Spruce Street School with 479 students in grades Pre-K–1, 
Lakewood Middle School with 1,334 students in grades 6–8 and 
Lakewood High School with 1,243 students in grades 9–12.

In recent years, the Lakewood School District has had budgetary issues, shutting down briefly in 2019 due to a funding deficit. The district spends more money on special education programs than any other district in the state and has a high bill for mandatory busing to non-public schools. Town leaders also cite imbalanced state funding formulas as the root of the district's financial problems.

Georgian Court University is a private, Roman Catholic university located on the shores of Lake Carasaljo. Founded in 1908 by the Sisters of Mercy as a women's college in North Plainfield, New Jersey, the school moved to the former estate of George Jay Gould I in Lakewood in 1924. Women made up 88% of the student population in Fall 2006.

There are many yeshivas and Jewish day schools serving the Orthodox Jewish community, with the school district providing busing to 18,000 students enrolled at 74 yeshivas as of 2011, and 25,000 by 2016. BMG, one of the world's largest yeshivas, had an enrollment in excess of 5,000. It is a post high school institution for higher education, where students primarily focus on the study of the Talmud and halakha (Jewish law).

The non-denominational Calvary Academy serves students in kindergarten through twelfth grade.

The Roman Catholic-affiliated Holy Family School served youth from preschool through eighth grade under the auspices of the Roman Catholic Diocese of Trenton. In 2014, the diocese announced that the school was closing at the end of the 2014–2015 school year, as fewer students were enrolling.

Arts and culture

The Strand Theater, established in 1922, was designed by architect Thomas W. Lamb.

Sports
ShoreTown Ballpark, home of the Jersey Shore BlueClaws, is a 6,588-seat stadium constructed at a cost of $22 million through funds raised from the township's Urban Enterprise Zone.

The High-A East's Jersey Shore BlueClaws, the High-A Minor League Baseball affiliate of the Philadelphia Phillies, play at FirstEnergy Park. The BlueClaws, previously known as the Lakewood Blue Claws, have led the league in attendance every year since its formation in 2001 up until 2011, with more than 380,000 fans in the 2001 season, representing an average attendance of more than 6,200 fans per game.

Parks and recreation
Ocean County Park offers tennis courts, sports fields, hiking trails, beach volleyball, a driving range, swimming and cross-country skiing. Lakes Carasaljo and Shenandoah have canoe and kayak access, and jogging trails. The Sister Mary Grace Burns Arboretum is located on the campus of Georgian Court University.

Government

Local government 
Lakewood Township is governed under the Township form of New Jersey municipal government, one of 141 municipalities (of the 564) statewide that use this form, the second-most commonly used form of government in the state. The Township Committee is comprised of five members, who are elected directly by the voters at-large in partisan elections to serve three-year terms of office on a staggered basis, with either one or two seats coming up for election each year as part of the November general election in a three-year cycle. At an annual reorganization meeting, the Township Committee selects one of its members to serve as Mayor and another as Deputy Mayor.

The Township Committee controls all legislative powers of the Township except for health matters, which are controlled by the Board of Health. In addition, the Committee appoints members to boards, commissions, and committees. Each member of the township committee serves as a liaison to different divisions, departments, and committees.

The mayor, elected from among members of the committee, presides at meetings and performs other duties as the Township Committee may prescribe. The mayor has the power to appoint subcommittees with the consent of the committee. When authorized, he or she may execute documents on behalf of the township, makes proclamations concerning holidays and events of interest, and exercises ceremonial power of the Township and other powers conferred upon him by law.

, the members of the Lakewood Township Committee are Mayor Ray Coles (D, term on committee ends December 31, 2023; term as mayor ends 2022), Deputy mayor Menashe Miller (R, 2024), Albert Akerman (R, 2022), Michael J. D'Elia Sr. (R, 2023) and Meir Lichtenstein (D, 2024).

Police
Lakewood Township is served by the Lakewood Police Department (LPD), which provides police protection for the township. It has several specialized units: Traffic and Safety, School Resource Officers, Special Response Team (SWAT), Dive Team, and a Motorcycle Patrol and Bicycle Patrol unit in the spring and summer. The current Chief of Police is Gregory Meyer.

Fire
Lakewood Township is served by the Lakewood Fire Department (LFD), a unified combination consisting of four Volunteer Fire Stations and one career fire station which provide fire protection for the township.

The fire department was founded in October 1888. The Board of Fire Commissioners was created in 1896. The first motorized equipment was purchased in 1915. The largest fire in township history occurred on April 20, 1940, when a forest fire destroyed over 50 structures and burned down most of the southern half of town. The largest loss of life caused by fire occurred on February 12, 1936, when the Victoria Mansion Hotel, valued at $100,000 (equivalent to $ million in ), located on the southeast corner of Lexington Avenue and Seventh Street, was destroyed in a fire and 16 people died. The largest structure fire in department history occurred on March 29, 1967, when the block-long Laurel in the Pines Hotel was leveled by a suspicious fire that also killed three people. The last fire hose was picked up a week later when the fire was finally declared out.

There are currently 32 career firefighters (Including a Career Fire Chief, 2 Captains 6 Lieutenants) and approximately 40 volunteer firefighters.

The Chief of the Lakewood Fire Department is Jonathan Yahr.

Fire stations
Fire stations are located across the township:
Engine Company 1 – Engine 1, Engine 11; 119 First Street
Engine 2, 1350 Lanes Mills Road
Engine 3; 976 New Hampshire Avenue
Ladder 3, Engine 33; 170 Lafayette Boulevard
Engine 4, Engine 44; 300 River Avenue
Engine 5 735 Cedarbridge Avenue (Career)
Ladder 5 800 Monmouth Avenue (Career)
Support Services & RAC Unit (Rehab) 733 Cedarbridge Avenue

EMS
Lakewood Township is served by three emergency medical services (EMS) entities, which include Lakewood EMS (LEMS), Lakewood First Aid & Emergency Squad (LFAS) and Hatzolah EMS. The squads are all independently operated, but work together to provide emergency medical services for the township. Lakewood First Aid & Emergency Squad and Hatzolah EMS are volunteer organizations, while Lakewood EMS is a career municipal service under the direction of EMS Chief Crystal Van de Zilver.
In the event of a motor vehicle accident, Lakewood First Aid & Emergency Squad are the primary providers of vehicle extrication services for the township and Hatzolah EMS serves as backup.

The three organizations collectively have approximately 150 volunteer and paid EMTs. Hatzolah also has a paramedic unit by special arrangement with RWJBarnabas Health.
Lakewood First Aid & Emergency Squad – Squad 25 – 1555 Pine Street
Hatzolah EMS – Squad 45 – Monmouth Avenue and 3rd Street, 501 West County Line Road at Heathwood Avenue

EMS Department 
Lakewood EMS – Squad 52 – 1555 Pine Street

Federal, state, and county representation 
Lakewood Township is located in the 4th Congressional District, and is part of New Jersey's 30th state legislative district.

 

Ocean County is governed by a Board of County Commissioners comprised of five members who are elected on an at-large basis in partisan elections and serving staggered three-year terms of office, with either one or two seats coming up for election each year as part of the November general election. At an annual reorganization held in the beginning of January, the board chooses a Director and a Deputy Director from among its members. , Ocean County's Commissioners (with party affiliation, term-end year and residence) are:

Commissioner Director John P. Kelly (R, 2022, Eagleswood Township),
Commissioner Deputy Director Virginia E. Haines (R, 2022, Toms River),
Barbara Jo Crea (R, 2024, Little Egg Harbor Township)
Gary Quinn (R, 2024, Lacey Township) and
Joseph H. Vicari (R, 2023, Toms River). Constitutional officers elected on a countywide basis are 
County Clerk Scott M. Colabella (R, 2025, Barnegat Light),
Sheriff Michael G. Mastronardy (R, 2022; Toms River) and
Surrogate Jeffrey Moran (R, 2023, Beachwood).

Politics
As of March 2011, there were a total of 37,925 registered voters in Lakewood Township, of which 6,417 (16.9%) were registered as Democrats, 13,287 (35.0%) were registered as Republicans, and 18,202 (48.0%) were registered as Unaffiliated. There were 19 voters registered to other parties. Among the township's 2010 Census population, 40.8% (vs. 63.2% in Ocean County) were registered to vote, including 70.2% of those ages 18 and over (vs. 82.6% countywide).

The Vaad in Lakewood is an 11-member council of elders from the Orthodox community, which greatly influences the way the community will vote, often after interviewing political candidates.

In the 2020 presidential election, Republican Donald Trump received 82.5% of the vote (30,648 votes), ahead of Democrat Joe Biden with 17.2% (6,397 votes), and other candidates with 0.3% (117 votes). Trump won his greatest margin from any municipality in the whole state. In the 2016 presidential election, Republican Donald Trump received 74.4% of the vote (17,914 votes), ahead of Democrat Hillary Clinton with 24.2% (5,841 votes), and other candidates with 1.4% (333 votes). In the 2012 presidential election. Republican Mitt Romney received 72.9% of the vote (19,273 cast), ahead of Democrat Barack Obama with 26.7% (7,062 votes), and other candidates with 0.3% (87 votes), among the 26,590 ballots cast by the township's 41,233 registered voters (168 ballots were spoiled), for a turnout of 64.5%. In the 2008 presidential election, Republican John McCain received 69.1% of the vote (19,173 cast), ahead of Democrat Barack Obama with 29.7% (8,242 votes), and other candidates with 0.5% (144 votes), among the 27,750 ballots cast by the township's 39,640 registered voters, for a turnout of 70.0%. In the 2004 presidential election, Republican George W. Bush received 66.4% of the vote (16,045 ballots cast), outpolling Democrat John Kerry with 32.5% (7,852 votes) and other candidates with 0.4% (137 votes), among the 24,152 ballots cast by the township's 35,217 registered voters, for a turnout percentage of 68.6.

In the 2013 gubernatorial election, Republican Chris Christie received 82.4% of the vote (11,850 cast), ahead of Democrat Barbara Buono with 16.9% (2,427 votes), and other candidates with 0.7% (107 votes), among the 14,921 ballots cast by the township's 41,567 registered voters (537 ballots were spoiled), for a turnout of 35.9%. In the 2009 gubernatorial election, Republican Chris Christie received 54.9% of the vote (10,528 ballots cast), ahead of Democrat Jon Corzine with 30.8% (5,910 votes), Independent Chris Daggett with 2.6% (506 votes) and other candidates with 0.7% (142 votes), among the 19,171 ballots cast by the township's 37,928 registered voters, yielding a 50.5% turnout.

Transportation

Roads and highways

The Garden State Parkway is the most prominent highway in Lakewood. It passes through the eastern part of the municipality, connecting Toms River in the south to Brick in the north with one major interchange serving Lakewood at exit 89. Drivers can access Route 70 from exit 89, after exit 88 was permanently closed in November 2014. The state and U.S. routes that pass through are Route 70, Route 88 and Route 9. Major county routes that pass through are CR 526, CR 528, CR 547 and CR 549.

Public transportation
The Lakewood Bus Terminal is a regional transit hub. NJ Transit provides bus service on the 137 and 139 routes to and from the Port Authority Bus Terminal in New York City, to Philadelphia on the 317 route, to Newark on the 67 and to Atlantic City on the 559.

The Lakewood Shuttle is a bus with two routes: one in town, and one in Industrial Park.

Ocean Ride local service is provided on the OC3 Brick / Lakewood / Toms River and OC4 Lakewood – Brick Link routes.

The airport is publicly owned.

The Monmouth Ocean Middlesex Line (MOM) is a passenger rail project proposed by NJ Transit Rail Operations (NJT) to serve the Central New Jersey counties of Monmouth, Ocean and Middlesex which would serve Lakewood.

Notable people

People who were born in, residents of, or otherwise closely associated with Lakewood Township include:

 Yitzchak Abadi (born 1933), rabbi and posek
 Morton I. Abramowitz (born 1933), diplomat
 Val Ackerman (born 1959), first president of the Women's National Basketball Association
 Jay Alders (class of 1996), fine artist, photographer and graphic designer, best known for his original surf art paintings
 Joe Baum (1920–1998), restaurateur
 Spider Bennett (born 1943), professional basketball player in the ABA with the Dallas Chaparrals and Houston Mavericks
 Tyrice Beverette (born 1995), professional Canadian football linebacker for the Hamilton Tiger-Cats of the Canadian Football League
 Yisroel Pinchos Bodner, rabbi and author of books on various topics of halakha
 Brandon Carter (born 1986), former offensive lineman for the Tampa Bay Buccaneers
 Haakon Chevalier (1901–1985), author, translator, and professor of French literature at the University of California, Berkeley, best known for his friendship with physicist J. Robert Oppenheimer
 Simcha Bunim Cohen, rabbi, posek and author
 Michael Cudlitz (born 1964), actor who has appeared in Southland and Band of Brothers
 Ngo Dinh Diem (1901–1963), first president of South Vietnam
 Marc Ecko (born 1972), founder and CEO of Eckō Unltd.
 Shimon Eider (died 2007), rabbi, author on halakha and expert on the construction of eruvin
 Mendel Epstein, convicted leader of the New York divorce coercion gang
 Dick Estelle (born 1942), pitcher who played for the San Francisco Giants
 Mike Gesicki (born 1995), tight end who plays for the Miami Dolphins of the National Football League
 Hazel Gluck (born 1934), politician and lobbyist who served in the New Jersey General Assembly and held several posts in the cabinet of Governor Thomas Kean
 William Goldstein (born 1942), composer, recording artist, arts philosopher and improvisational pianist
 George Jay Gould I (1864–1923), financier and railroad executive, whose estate became Georgian Court University
 Virginia E. Haines (born 1946), politician who serves on the Ocean County Board of chosen freeholders and had served in the New Jersey General Assembly from 1992 to 1994 and as Executive Director of the New Jersey Lottery from 1994 to 2002
 Yehudah Jacobs (–2020), mashgiach ruchani (spiritual guidance counselor) at BMG
 Serge Jaroff (1896–1985), conductor, composer and founder of the Don Cossack Chorus
 C.S. Eliot Kang (born 1962), diplomat and member of the Senior Executive Service
 Stan Kasten (born 1952), president and part-owner of the Los Angeles Dodgers, and former President of the Washington Nationals, Atlanta Braves, Atlanta Hawks and Atlanta Thrashers
* Shoshanna Keats Jaskoll (born 1975), activist and writer whose work focuses on women's rights in Orthodox Judaism and the visibility of women in Israel's Orthodox communities.
 Edith Kingdon (1864–1921), actress wife of George Jay Gould I
 Aharon Kotler (1892–1962), founder of BMG and a pre-eminent authority on Torah in the 20th Century among Haredi Jews
 Shneur Kotler (1918–1982), rosh yeshiva (dean) of BMG
 Malkiel Kotler (born 1951), current rosh yeshiva of BMG
 Cliff Kresge (born 1968), professional golfer
 Joseph Mayer (1877–1942), mayor of Belmar, New Jersey, who later served on the Ocean County Board of Chosen Freeholders
 Sonia Handelman Meyer (1920–2022), photographer best known for her street photography as a member of the New York Photo League
 Purnell Mincy (1916–2003), Negro league baseball pitcher from 1938 to 1940
 Charles W. Morse (1856–1933), Wall Street speculator
 Loren Murchison (1898–1979), Olympic athlete who won gold medals in 1920 and 1924 in the 4x100m relay event
 Yisroel Neuman, (born 1947) rosh yeshiva of BMG
 Yerucham Olshin, rosh yeshiva of BMG
 Arthur Newton Pack (1893–1975), naturalist and writer who founded the American Nature Association and the periodical Nature Magazine
 Haydn Proctor (1903–1996), member of the New Jersey Senate
 Yosef Reinman, rabbi and author who has written about inter-community dialogue within Judaism
 Richard Roberts (born 1957), pharmaceutical executive, philanthropist and political activist
 John D. Rockefeller (1839–1937), industrialist and philanthropist, had an estate in Lakewood, as well as other homes in Ohio, New York, and Florida. His family donated a large tract of land it owned in Lakewood to Ocean County, where the County built the current Ocean County Park on Route 88, Lakewood
 Allen L. Rothenberg Esq. (born 1951), president of the National Jewish Commission on Law and Public Affairs (COLPA)
 Robert Schmertz (1926–1975), founder and CEO of Leisure Technology Corp. and former owner of the Portland Trail Blazers and Boston Celtics
 Dovid Schustal (born 1947), rosh yeshiva of BMG
 Armin Shimerman (born 1949), actor, best known for playing the Ferengi bartender Quark in the television series Star Trek: Deep Space Nine
 Betsy Sholl (born 1945), poet who was poet laureate of Maine from 2006 to 2011
 Arthur Siegel (1923–1994), songwriter
 Robert Singer (born 1947), member of the New Jersey Senate and former Mayor of Lakewood Township
 J. R. Smith (born 1985), NBA basketball player who plays for Cleveland Cavaliers
 Lew Soloff (born 1944), jazz trumpeter
 Yisroel Taplin, author of The Date Line in Halacha
 Penina Taylor, counter-missionary speaker
 Steve Tisch (born 1948), film producer and chairman of the New York Giants
 Harry Lancaster Towe (1898–1991), politician who represented New Jersey's 9th congressional district in the United States House of Representatives from 1943 to 1951
 Marc Turtletaub (born 1946), CEO of The Money Store and film producer and director
 Jake Turx (born 1986), senior White House correspondent and chief political correspondent for Ami magazine
 Charles Waterhouse (1924–2013), artist
 Mookie Wilson (born 1956), baseball player, mostly notably with the New York Mets

Sister cities
 Bnei Brak, Israel, since 2011

See also

Jewish population by city

Further reading

References

Sources
 Axel-Lute, Paul. Lakewood-in-the-Pines: A History of Lakewood, New Jersey, self-published, 1986 (South Orange, NJ)

External links

Lakewood Township website

 
1892 establishments in New Jersey
Beth Medrash Govoha
Orthodox Judaism in New Jersey
New Jersey Urban Enterprise Zones
Orthodox Jewish communities
Populated places established in 1892
Township form of New Jersey government
Townships in Ocean County, New Jersey